Ian Chessell is an Australian physicist. He was Chief Defence Scientist of Australia from 2000 to 2003. He was appointed as Chief Scientist of South Australia in March 2008, and served in that capacity until 2010. He was a director of Astronomy Australia Limited from 2010 until the 2016 AGM. In 2015, he was also a member of the Defence South Australia Advisory Board, the Board of QinetiQ Pty Ltd and is Chair of the Goyder Institute for Water Research.

Chessell studied at the University of Melbourne, completing his Ph.D. in Physics studying radio transmission of the lower ionosphere in 1970. He commenced work at the Defence Science and Technology Group on completion of his Ph.D., eventually rising to head the organisation as Chief Defence Scientist from 2000 to 2003.

References

  

Chief Defence Scientists
Australian physicists
Living people
Fellows of the Australian Academy of Technological Sciences and Engineering
Year of birth missing (living people)